Daphnella canaliculata is a species of sea snail, a marine gastropod mollusc in the family Raphitomidae.

Description
The length of the shell attains 8 mm.

Distribution
This marine species occurs off the Philippines.

References

 Ardovini R. 2009. Nuova Daphnella delle Filippine (Gastropoda: Prosobranchia, Conidae). Malacologia Mostra Mondiale 64: 8-9 
 Stahlschmidt P., Poppe G.T. & Chino M. (2014) Description of seven new Daphnella species from the Philippines (Gastropoda: Raphitomidae). Visaya 4(2): 29-38.

External links
 Gastropods.com: Daphnella canaliculata

canaliculata
Gastropods described in 2009